White: The Great Pursuit is a novel by Christian author Ted Dekker.  It is the third book of four in the Circle series.

Plot
The Circle resides in the deserts, able to survive by the aid of Johan (formerly Martyn). During a council meeting, the new commander of the Horde armies, Woref, orchestrates an invasion on Thomas' tribe. Thomas, Suzan, William and the brothers Stephen and Cain ride towards the army, leading their capture. Qurong, the Horde leader, takes his prisoners before his wife Patricia and daughter Chelise. Qurong announces that Chelise is to be wed to Woref. Thomas appeals to Qurong and Chelise's desire to learn the Books of Histories, knowing that the Horde cannot read them while members of The Circle can. Chelise pleads for Thomas to be spared on the basis that it would be more humiliating to be made her servant. The group is returned to their tribe and greeted by William, who informs them that the Horde has attacked. They have killed ten members of the Circle, wounded others, and taken 24 prisoners.

In Ancient Earth. Thomas has turned Carlos by allowing him to sleep while in contact with his blood, where Carlos dreams of the other reality as Johan. He decides to join with Thomas in an effort to stop Svensson and Fortier from executing their plans: Only releasing the antivirus to a small list of people they deemed worthy. America has turned its naval fleet, airforce and nuclear arsenal over to the French. As a last-ditch effort to resist high-ranking U.S., British and Israeli officials order the USS Nimitz to sink the fleet. When Thomas returns to Washington D.C., he meets with President Blair, Monique and his sister Kara at Genetrix Labs to check on the antivirus progress, but the only feasible cure is through his blood. It instantly eradicates the virus, and Monique and Kara believe it to be because he swam in Elyon's lake and breathed the water in effectively making his blood immune. He mounts his horse and rides around them with his sword in the sand symbolically carving a circle. He leaves them with the Roshuim in pursuit. In the few days since Chelise drowned in the red water, 5,000 Scabs followed in pursuit of Elyons gift through Justin.

2004 American novels
2004 science fiction novels
American Christian novels
American thriller novels
Novels by Ted Dekker
Thomas Nelson (publisher) books